Generative design is an iterative design process that generates outputs that meet specified constraints to varying degrees. In a second phase, designers can then provide feedback to the generator that explores the feasible region by selecting preferred outputs or changing input parameters for future iterations. Either or both phases can be done by humans or software. One method is to use a generative adversarial network, which is a pair of neural networks. The first generates a trial output. The second provides feedback for the next iteration.

The output can be items such as images, sounds, architectural models, animation, and industrial parts. It is used in design fields such as art, architecture, communication design, and product design.

Computers can explore orders of magnitude more permutations, exploring the interactions of the enormous numbers of design elements in small increments.It mimics nature’s evolutionary approach to design through genetic variation and selection. These techniques are available even for designers with little programming experience. It is supported by commercially available CAD packages. Tools leveraging generative design as a foundation are available.

Compared with traditional top-down design approaches, generative design addresses design problems by using a bottom-up paradigm. The solution itself then evolves to a good, if not optimal, solution.

Generative design involves rule definition and result analysis which are integrated with the design process. By defining parameters and rules, the generative approach is able to provide optimized solution for both structural stability and aesthetics. Possible design algorithms include cellular automata, shape grammar, genetic algorithm, space syntax, and most recently, artificial neural network. Due to the high complexity of the solution generated, rule-based computational tools, such as finite element method and topology optimisation, are more preferable to evaluate and optimise the generated solution. The iterative process provided by computer software enables the trial-and-error approach in design, and involves architects interfering with the optimisation process.

The software then begins iterating, changing things a bit at a time, much like random mutations try out new combinations of animal DNA, and testing it against the necessary performance targets, much like life tests its DNA mutations. Over millions of generations, the software adds a little metal here, removes a little there, and checks if the part is stronger or weaker, lighter or heavier than its predecessors.

Within a surprisingly short time (a couple of hours, if given access to high-powered cloud processing), it comes back with shapes humans could never have directly designed. But they're strikingly similar to the work of nature; where there's more stress to be dealt with, they gradually become thicker. Where there's less stress, they get thinner. Support structures waste away where they're not needed, and tend to line up with the load path. In short, they start looking weirdly bony and organic.

Applications

Architecture 
Generative design has been applied in architecture. Architectural design has long been regarded as a wicked problem. The advantage of using generative design as a design tool is that it does not construct fixed geometries, but take a set of design rules that can generate an infinite set of possible design solutions. The generated design solutions can be more sensitive, responsive, and adaptive to the wicked problem.

Historical precedent work includes Antoni Gaudí's Sagrada Família, which used rule-based geometrical forms for structures, and Buckminster Fuller's Montreal Biosphere where the rules to generate individual components is designed, rather than the final product.

More recent generative design cases includes Foster and Partners' Queen Elizabeth II Great Court, where the tessellated glass roof was designed using a geometric schema to define hierarchical relationships, and then the generated solution was optimized based on geometrical and structural requirement.

Component design 
NASA has begun using generative design in its parts. What they call "evolved structures" weigh less and stress concentrations common in human designs. Weights go down by as much as two thirds, while stress factors are nearly 10 times lower. Such parts are often made via additive manufacturing. Design and manufacturing can take as little as one week. Parts appear in  projects such as the Mars Sample Return mission, space telescopes, weather monitors, planetary instruments, and balloon observatories.

See also 

 Computer art
 Computer-automated design
 Feedback
 Generative art
 Parametric design
 Procedural modeling
 Random number generation
 System dynamics
 Topology optimization

References

Further reading
 Gary William Flake: The Computational Beauty of Nature: Computer Explorations of Fractals, Chaos, Complex Systems, and Adaptation. MIT Press 1998, 
 John Maeda: Design by Numbers, MIT Press 2001, 

 Celestino Soddu: papers on Generative Design (1991-2011) at Generative Art Design Papers. C.Soddu, E.Colabella

Design
Computer graphics